Qeshlaq-e Qanbarlu Hajj Mohammad Hasan (also Romanized as Qeshlāq-e Qanbarlū Ḩājj Moḩammad Ḩasan) is a village in Qeshlaq-e Gharbi Rural District, Aslan Duz District, Parsabad County, Ardabil Province, Iran. At the 2006 census, its population was 141, in 20 families.

References 

Towns and villages in Parsabad County